A chuckwagon is a type of field kitchen covered wagon historically used in the United States and Canada.

Chuckwagon or chuck wagon may also refer to:

 Chuck Wagon (dog food), a product of Nestlé Purina PetCare
 Chuckwagon, nickname for the U.S. Military Material Identification Division
 Chuckwagon, a slang term for a food truck
 Chuckwagon racing, an equestrian rodeo sport

Music
 Chuck Wagon (musician) (1956–1981; born Robert Davis), American punk rock musician
 Chuck Wagon & the Wheels, an American country music group, circa 2000
 The Chuck Wagon Gang, an American country gospel musical group formed in 1935

See also